The women's 4 × 200 metre freestyle relay competition at the 2002 Pan Pacific Swimming Championships took place on August 28 at the Yokohama International Swimming Pool.  The last champion was the United States.

This race consisted of sixteen lengths of the pool. Each of the four swimmers completed four lengths of the pool. The first swimmer had to touch the wall before the second could leave the starting block.

Records
Prior to this competition, the existing world and Pan Pacific records were as follows:

Results
All times are in minutes and seconds.

Heats
Heats weren't performed, as only seven teams had entered.

Final 
The final was held on August 28.

References

4 × 200 metre freestyle relay
2002 Pan Pacific Swimming Championships
2002 in women's swimming